James Crockett (February 17, 1910 – July 30, 1986) was a U.S. soccer center back who was a member of the U.S. soccer team at the 1936 Summer Olympics.

Crockett was selected as a member of the U.S. soccer team at the 1936 Olympic Games.  He played in the only U.S. game of the tournament, a 1-0 loss to Italy.  At the time, he played for the Philadelphia German-Americans of the American Soccer League. In 1936, Crockett and his team mates defeated the St. Louis Shamrocks in the National Challenge Cup.

He died in Meadowood, Pennsylvania.

References

American soccer players
Olympic soccer players of the United States
Footballers at the 1936 Summer Olympics
American Soccer League (1933–1983) players
Uhrik Truckers players
1910 births
1986 deaths
Association football central defenders